Sergio Ruiz Alonso (born 16 December 1994) is a Spanish professional footballer who plays for Granada CF. Mainly a central midfielder, he can also play as a right back.

Club career
Born in El Astillero, Cantabria, Ruiz represented CD Arenas de Trajanas, CA Perines and CD Laredo as a youth. In 2013, after finishing his formation, he joined Tercera División side CD Pontejos, and made his debut for the club during the campaign.

Ruiz subsequently represented fellow fourth division sides SD Atlético Albericia and Racing de Santander B before being promoted to the latter's first team for the 2016–17 season, in Segunda División B.

On 17 January 2019, Ruiz extended his contract with the Verdiblancos until 2022. He contributed with six goals in 34 appearances in 2018–19, as his side returned to Segunda División after a four-year absence.

Ruiz made his professional debut on 17 August 2019, coming on as a late substitute for Álvaro Cejudo in a 0–1 home loss against Málaga CF.

On 8 July 2020, it was announced that Ruiz became the first ever signing for Charlotte FC ahead of their inaugural season in MLS in 2022. On 3 September, he joined second division side UD Las Palmas on an 18-month loan.

On 9 August 2022, Ruiz signed a four-year contract with Granada CF in the second division.

References

External links
 

1994 births
Living people
Spanish footballers
Footballers from Cantabria
Association football defenders
Association football midfielders
Segunda División players
Segunda División B players
Tercera División players
Rayo Cantabria players
Racing de Santander players
UD Las Palmas players
Granada CF footballers
Major League Soccer players
Charlotte FC players
Spanish expatriate footballers
Spanish expatriate sportspeople in the United States
Expatriate soccer players in the United States